Live Art Development Agency, known by its acronym LADA, is an arts organisation and registered charity founded in London in 1999 by Lois Keidan and Catherine Ugwu. LADA provides professional advice for artists as well as producing events and publications intended to enhance the understanding of and access to Live Art. They are an Arts Council England's National Portfolio Organisations. In 2021 Lois Keidan stood down as director, and Barak adé Soleil and Chinasa Vivian Ezugha were appointed as joint Co-Directors.

Activities
LADA is responsible for funding and co-ordinating Live Art UK, a network for bringing together organisations to support and develop Live Art infrastructures.

The LADA Study Room is an open access research facility for artists, students, curators, academics and other arts professionals. The Study Room houses a collection of more than 8,000 items ranging from theoretical texts to DVDs, videos, CDs and digital files of performance documents and documentation. This resource was described by The Independent as one of the UK's 50 best museums and galleries.

Selected Projects and Initiatives 
 LADA Screens - a series of free, online screenings of seminal performance documentation, works to camera, short films/video and archival footage.
 Performance Magazine Online, is an online archive created by LADA in collaboration with the original editor Robert La Frenais, of Performance Magazine. Published between 1979 and 1992, the magazine documents a significant period in the development of art in the UK.
 "15 Minutes With…" podcasts launched in 2014 to celebrate the 15th Anniversary of the Live Art Development Agency. Short dialogues with some of the artists and thinkers that LADA has worked with, including Lois Weaver, French & Mottershead, Maddy Costa and Mary Paterson, Joshua Sofaer and Stacy Makishi.
 FRESH AiR - is an initiative from Queen Mary, University of London, produced in collaboration with the Live Art Development Agency, offering recent graduates and emergent artists support, advice and professional development, features the FRESH AiR PLATFORM (an open submissions performance platform, mentoring, and critical feedback for programmed artists) and FRESH TIPS (a day of information and advice from experienced artists).
 DIY: an opportunity for artists working in Live Art to conceive and run professional development projects for other artists.
 Restock, Rethink, Reflect - An ongoing series of initiatives for, and about, artists who are engaging with issues of identity politics and cultural diversity in innovative and radical ways. Each RRR project is under a different theme: race (2006–08), disability (2009–12), feminism (2013–14), privilege (2016-18) and Managing the Radical (2019-21).
 Life Lecture - An online resource which structures and directs an audience to deliver a lecture to themselves about themselves. Life Lecture has been created by Joshua Sofaer, published and distributed by the Live Art Development Agency and the dramaturg and editor in chief is Sibylle Peters in cooperation with the Interactive-Science-Program/ ZMI Geissen. Webdesign and authoring by Platform3.
 Live Culture (2003) an event at Tate Modern which included performances from Franko B, Forced Entertainment and a lecture by Marina Abramović.

LADA produces projects to help develop the visibility of, and opportunities for, artists making live work from diverse backgrounds.

Publications
LADA has published and co-published a number of titles relating to Live Art: 

Out of Now: The Lifeworks of Tehching Hsieh, edited by Adrian Heathfield, with the MIT Press, Perform Repeat Record edited by Adrian Heathfield and Amelia Jones with Intellect. Intellect Live book series a collaboration with Intellect Books on influential artists working at the edge of performance:
 Joshua Sofaer (2020) edited by Roberta Mock and Mary Paterson
 Anne Bean (2019) edited by Rob La Frenais
 Kira O'Reilly (2018) edited by Harriet Curtis and Martin Hargreaves
 Adrian Howells (2016) edited by Deirdre Heddon and Dominic Johnson
 Lois Weaver (2016) edited by Lois Weaver and Jen Harvie
 Ron Athey (2015) edited by Dominic Johnson
 Raimond Hoghe (2013) edited by Mary Kate Connolly
The Live Art Almanac is an edited collection of writing on Live Art, gathered and re-published as a volume on an occasional basis since 2008.

 The Live Art Almanac (2008) edited by Daniel Brine with contributions from: Tim Atack, Madeleine Bunting, Barbara Campbell, Simon Casson, Brian Catling, Rachel Lois Clapham, Helen Cole, Stephen Duncombe, Tim Etchells, Ed Caesar, David Gale, Lyn Gardner, Guillermo Gomez-Pena, Daniel Gosling, Leslie Hill, John Jordan, Nick Kimberley, Adam E Mendelsohn, Alex Needham, Sally O’Reilly, Mary Paterson, Will Pollard, Chris Riding, Nick Ridout, Ian Saville, Theron Schmidt, Rebecca Schneider, Rajni Shah, Mark Wilshire and John Wyver.
 The Live Art Almanac Vol. 2 (2011) edited by Lois Keidan, CJ Mitchell and Andrew Mitchelson with contributions from: David A Bailey, Guy Brett, Gavin Butt, Helen Cole, Wesley Enoch, Andy Field, Lyn Gardner, Guillermo Gómez-Peña, Manick Govinda, Matthew Hearn, Simon Herbert, Lucas Ihlein, Bridgit Istim, Jonathan Jones, Nick Keys, Carol Kino, Caleb Kraces, Astrid Lorange, Arthur Lubow, Jason Maling, Paul Morley, Rabih Mroué, Lizzie Muller, Mary Paterson, Mike Pearson, Theron Schmidt, Aleks Sierz, Alistair Spalding, Julian Stallabrass, Jane Trowell, David Vaughan, David Williams (Australia), David Williams (UK), Aaron Williamson.
 The Live Art Almanac Vol. 3 (2013) edited by Lois Keidan and Aaron Wright with contributions by: Aine Phillips, Alexis Petridis, Andrew Haydon, Andy Field, Andy Horwitz, Barrak Alzaid, Barry Laing, Ben Walters, Brian Lobel, Carrie McLlwain, Cat Harrison, Catherine Spencer, Charlotte Raven, Claire Bishop, Claudia La Rocco, Clifford Owens, Cristiane Bouger CRITICALNETWORK  Dana Goodyear, Daniel B. Yates, Daniel McClean, Deborah Pearson, Diana Damian, Dina Abrahim, Dominic Johnson, Eddy Dreadnought, Emily James, Emma G Eliot, Esther Baker-Tarpaga, Fabiane Borges, Flora Pitrolo, Gabriela Salgado, Genesis P-orridge, Gob Squad, Guillermo Gómez-Peña, Hari Kunzru, Helen Cole, Henry Langston, Henry Lydiate, Ian Milliss, James Westcott, Jane Trowell, Joanna Brown, Joe E. Jeffreys, John Jordan, John Maus, Johnathan Waring, Judith Mackrell, Kristin M. Jones, Larissa Ferreira, Liberate Tate, Liz Kotz, Lois Jeary, Lucy Neal, Luke Jennings, Maddy Costa, Malcolm Whittaker, Manick Govinda, Marcia Farquhar, Marina Abramović, Mark Harvey, Marta Jecu, Mary Paterson, Matt Fenton, Matt Trueman, Natasha Degen, Natasha Vicars, Oliver Basciano, Ontroerend Goed, Owen Parry, Paul Levinson, Pushpamala N, Roberta Mock, Roger Ely, Rose Fenton, Rubiane Maia, Ruth Holdsworth, Ruth Maclennan, Sally Labern, Sara Panamby, Rosa Da Silva, Sean O'Hagan, Stephen Squibb, Steven L. Bridges, Stuart Tait, Tamarin Norwood, Tania El Khoury, Theron Schmidt, Tiffany Charrington, Verenilde Santos, Victoria Gray, Yoko Ono, You Me Bum Bum Train
 The Live Art Almanac Vol. 4 (2016) edited by Harriet Curtis, Lois Keidan and Aaron Wright with contributions by: Adrian Howells, Ai Weiwei, Amelia Abraham, Ann Magnuson, Boychild, Brian Boucher, Bryony Kimmings, Christeene, Claire Bishop, Coco Fusco, Guy Brett, Hennessy Youngman, Jennifer Doyle, Joan Rivers, José Esteban Muñoz, Karen Finley, Kembra Pfahler, Marcia Farquhar, Marilyn Arsem, Mat Fraser, Matthew Barney, Mike Kelley, Monica Ross. Morgan Quaintance. Mykki Blanco. Nigel Charnock, Oreet Ashery, Petr Pavlensky, Pussy Riot, Reverend Billy, Ron Athey, Rose Finn-Kelcey, Shaheen Merali, Stuart Hall, Tim Etchells, Vaginal Davis, Wendy Houstoun, Wu Tsang.
 The Live Art Almanac Vol. 5 (2019) edited by Bojana Janković, Megan Vaughan, Lois Keidan with contributions by: Adrian Howells, Alastair Maclennan, Alexandrina Hemsley, Amelia Jones, Bob Flanagan, Cassils, Chris Kraus, Cosey Fanni Tutti, David Wojnarowicz, Deborah Levy, Diana Damian Martin, Doran George, Forest Fringe, Frie Leysen, Hester Chillingworth, Jamie Lewis Hadley, Jennifer Doyle, Jérôme Bel, Jill Soloway, Kathy Acker, Lydia Lunch, Mainstream, Malik Nashad Sharpe, Marilyn Arsem, Mary Paterson, Mel Evans, Melanie Keen, Morgan Quaintance, Oleg Kulik, Petr Pavlensky, Preach R Sun, Ron Athey, Scottee, Selina Thompson, Stephen Pritchard, Tania El Khoury, Tanja Ostojic, Tim Etchells, Volksbühne.

Patrons 
LADA has a board of patrons composed of 10 established artists who have contributed significantly to the development of Live Art.

 Marina Abramović
 Ron Athey
 Anne Bean
 Sonia Boyce
 Tim Etchells
 Guillermo Gómez-Peña
 Raimund Hoghe
 Tehching Hsieh
 Isaac Julien
 La Ribot

Key reading
 Keiden, L, Mitchell, CJ. 'In Time: A Collection of Live Art Case Studies'Eds. Live Art Development Agency in collaboration with Live Art UK

References

External links
The Live Art Development Agency
Live Art Development Agency (LADA) at Google Cultural Institute

Performing arts in England
English art
Arts in England
Arts organisations based in the United Kingdom